Dayal Kaur Khalsa (April 17, 1943 – July 17, 1989) was the American-born author and illustrator of numerous award-winning children's books.  She discovered her talent in Canada, where she had moved in 1970.  Over the span of four short years before her death at the age of 46, she managed to write and illustrate eight picture books, three of them published posthumously.

Biography
Born Marcia Schonfeld in Queens, New York, young Dayal Kaur spent her days with her Grandma Shapiro while both her parents worked.  Her childhood with her grandmother formed the basis of her works, especially Tales of a Gambling Grandma.  Grandma Shapiro's death in 1951 when Dayal Kaur was nine was devastating to her.

Dayal Kaur graduated from the City College of New York in 1963 and attended The Arts Students League from 1964 to 1965.  Though she still lived at home, Dayal Kaur had a loft space in Lower Manhattan and associated with mutually influential avant-garde artists, teachers, and students, including Roy Lichtenstein and his friends.  In 1966, her mother became ill with breast cancer.  She died the following year leaving Dayal Kaur with an apprehension of the agony she might experience if she were to become ill.

Around the time of her mother's illness, Dayal Kaur Khalsa was active in the civil rights movement in New York and in the American South. Afterwards, she toured Mexico with her father, brother and his wife, then stayed in San Miguel Allende for a time with fellow artist Brian Grison.

In 1970, Dayal Kaur moved to Canada with Grison and stayed on when their relationship ended, supporting herself in desultory work that included cleaning other people's houses.  In 1974, she moved to a farm near Millbrook, Ontario with her artist friend, Yvonne Lammerich.  That farm provided the setting for her book Julian.

In 1975, Dayal Kaur left the farm and joined a women's health collective in Toronto.  When all the other members of the collective moved into the 3HO Kundalini Yoga Ashram, she moved along with them.  In time, she adopted the Sikh lifestyle and asked for and received her new name from Yogi Bhajan, meaning "princess of kindness and purity."

While living in the Ashram, Dayal Kaur became responsible for designing the 3HO's various promotional materials. This led to her business involvement in the late 1970s with the graphic design studio "Intermedia Associates" and other small business ventures with local artist/entrepreneur Brian Irving.

It was during this period Dayal received a series of parcels from New York City containing items from her former life as, "Marcia." In an abandoned art portfolio Brian discovered several vibrant drawings and story ideas (which Dayal later incorporated into her books). Despite his enthusiasm for these echos of her former life as an artist and writer, it was Dayal's belief that these former personal interests might be at odds with her commitment to a spartan spiritual lifestyle at the Ashram.

In the early 1980s, she moved to the 3HO live-in yoga centre in Montreal.

Although she published a short story in the Carolina Quarterly as Marcia Schonfeld in 1972, her first entry into the publishing world as Dayal Kaur Khalsa took place when she was introduced to May Cutler, publisher and president of Tundra Books. In Cutler's word's: "I met her in 1982 when she brought illustrations to show us. They did not impress for idea, content, or technical proficiency, but they had one quality that is less common than you would think: strong colour sense. She could mix garish colours together - rather like the Berber women of Morocco -- and come up with a vibrant and united whole."

Dayal Kaur's first project with Tundra was twelve object-recognition board books for infants done in her typically vibrant colours.  Her first book for older children, Tales of a Gambling Grandma, was a runaway success, winning her a lucrative American contract and a number of awards.  But before the accolades began to pour in, Dayal Kaur was beset by her father's suicide and her own diagnosis of breast cancer.  She toiled tirelessly and seven more books followed in close succession.  Her Canadian publisher remarked: "She was extremely generous with her art.  Her books have as many as twenty-five paintings – in contrast to half that many in many children's books – plus endleaves that are as caringly crafted as the interiors.  I asked her once where she got the energy and time to develop the stories and do fifty or sixty illustrations a year.  (That was between operations, hospital visits, chemotherapy, and all the accompanying discomfort.)  She grinned: "It's easy, May.  I've got a deadline."

Dayal Kaur Khalsa died of breast cancer at the age of 46 in Vancouver, British Columbia, Canada.

Works
In the Eyes of the Women, a short story she published as Marcia Schonfeld (Carolina Quarterly, Winter 1972, pp. 15–22)
The Baabee Books, Series I and II (Tundra, 1983)
The Baabee Books, Series III (Tundra, 1984)
Tales of a Gambling Grandma (Clarkson N. Potter and Tundra, 1986) 
Tales of a Gambling Grannie (In UK: MacDonald, 1988)
I Want a Dog (Clarkson N. Potter and Tundra, 1987)
Sleepers (Clarkson N. Potter and Tundra, 1988)
My Family Vacation (Clarkson N. Potter and Tundra, 1988)
How Pizza Came to Queens (Clarkson N. Potter, 1989)
How Pizza Came to Our Town (In Canada: Tundra, 1989)
Julian (Clarkson N. Potter and Tundra, 1989 - posthumous)
Cowboy Dreams (Clarkson N. Potter and Tundra, 1990 - posthumous)
Snow Cat (Clarkson N. Potter and Tundra, 1992 – posthumous)

Awards and honours
The New York Times Notable Children's Book 1986: Tales of a Gambling Grandma
New York Public Library's Best Children's Book 1986: Tales of a Gambling Grandma
Canada Council Children's Literature Prize Honourable Mention for Illustration 1987
Amelia Frances Howard-Gibbon Illustrator's Award Finalist 1987
American Institute of Graphic Arts Show Winner's List 1987: I Want a Dog
American Booksellers Association/Children's Book Council (United States) Children's Bestseller List 1988: I Want a Dog
Canadian Children's Book Centre 1988-89: I Want a Dog
Governor-General's Awards for Children's Illustration Finalist 1988: Sleepers
Parent's Choice Award for Book Illustration 1988: Sleepers
Booklist One of the Most Outstanding Picture Books of the Year 1988: My Family Vacation

Film adaptations
I Want a Dog
Snow Cat by Sheldon Cohen, National Film Board of Canada

References

External links 
 
 Archives of Dayal Kaur Khalsa (Dayal Kaur Khalsa fonds, R11759) are held at Library and Archives Canada

1943 births
1989 deaths
Canadian children's book illustrators
Canadian children's writers 
Deaths from breast cancer